Soulsonic Force (also referred to as Afrika Bambaataa & Soulsonic Force) is an American electro-funk and hip hop ensemble led by Afrika Bambaataa who helped establish hip-hop in the early 1980s with songs such as "Planet Rock." They were also influential in the birth of the electro movement in America and helped pave the way for modern dance music styles such as electro-funk as well as the entire Miami bass scene.

History
In 1982, Soulsonic Force and Afrika Bambaataa released a single "Planet Rock." The song borrowed musical motifs from German electro-pop, British rock and African-American disco rap. All the different elements and musical styles were blended together; and in doing so, offered hip hop as a new vision for global harmony. The song became an immediate hit and stormed the music charts worldwide.

Their other well-known songs include "Looking for the Perfect Beat" and "Renegades of Funk" (which is one of the earliest political-conscious rap songs, alongside Grandmaster Flash & the Furious Five's "The Message").

Soulsonic Force features on the title track of the Freestylers' debut album, We Rock Hard.

Lineup
 Afrika Bambaataa
 Mr. Biggs (real name: Ellis Williams)
 Pow Wow (real name: Robert Darrell Allen)
 The G.L.O.B.E (real name: John Miller)
 DJ Jazzy Jay (real name: John Byas)

Discography

Albums
 Planet Rock: The Album (1986)
 "Planet Rock" (Swordfish Mix) on the Swordfish soundtrack (see Swordfish).

Singles

References

External links
 

American hip hop groups